"Not a Criminal" is a track that was slated for Chamillionaire's second album, Ultimate Victory (2007). It was released on February 13, 2007. The song, which features Kelis on the chorus, was originally going to be released as the album's lead single, but was replaced by "Hip Hop Police". It was produced by Australian producer Styalz Fuego of the Affinity Music Group. The song has another version, "Not a Criminal Part II", which features Busta Rhymes and Snoop Dogg. The single debuted and peaked at number three on the Bubbling Under Hot 100 Singles chart.

Charts

References 

2007 songs
2007 singles
Busta Rhymes songs
Chamillionaire songs
Kelis songs
Snoop Dogg songs
Songs written by Kelis
Songs written by Chamillionaire
Universal Records singles